Orkdal is a former municipality in Trøndelag county, Norway. The municipality existed from 1838 until its dissolution in 2020 when it joined Orkland Municipality. It was part of the Orkdalen region.  The administrative centre of the municipality was the city of Orkanger.  Some of the notable villages in the municipality included Kjøra, Geitastrand, Gjølme, Thamshavn, Fannrem, Vormstad, Svorkmo, and Hoston.

Agriculture plays a significant role in the municipality.  The Thamshavnbanen was used to transport ore from Løkken Verk to the port of Thamshavn, and is now a vintage railway.  The Fannrem concentration camp was located in Fannrem during World War II. Orkanger is one of the main industrial hubs in central Norway. The industry is mainly located around Grønøra Industrial park. The largest companies are Technip Offshore Norge AS, Reinertsen, Washington Mills and Elkem Thamshavn AS.

At the time of its dissolution in 2020, the  municipality was the 188th largest by area out of the 422 municipalities in Norway. Orkdal was the 97th most populous municipality in Norway with a population of 11,933.

General information
The prestegjeld of Orkdal was established as a municipality on 1 January 1838 (see formannskapsdistrikt law).  On 1 July 1920, the port of Orkanger (population: 1,715) and the southern district of Orkland (population: 1,760) were separated from Orkdal to form separate municipalities. During the 1960s, there were many municipal mergers across Norway due to the work of the Schei Committee. On 1 January 1963, the municipalities of Orkanger, Orkland, and Geitastrand were merged with Orkdal to form a new, larger municipality of Orkdal.

On 1 January 2018, the municipality switched from the old Sør-Trøndelag county to the new Trøndelag county.

On 1 January 2020, the municipalities of Agdenes, Orkdal, and Meldal along with the majority of Snillfjord merged to form the new municipality of Orkland.

Name
The municipality (originally the parish) is named after the Orkdalen valley since the first Orkdal Church was built there. The first element is the genitive case of the name of the river  (now called Orklaelva). Historically, the name was spelled Orkedalen.

Coat of arms
The coat of arms was granted on 25 April 1986 and it was used until 1 January 2020 when the municipality was dissolved. The official blazon is "Vert, a pallet wavy argent". This means the arms have a green field (background) and the charge is a vertical wavy bar. The wavy line has a tincture of argent which means it is commonly colored white, but if it is made out of metal, then silver is used. The design was chosen to symbolize the river Orklaelva which runs through fertile Orkdalen valley throughout the municipality. The arms are also a canting because the name of the municipality is derived from the name of the river. The arms were designed by Einar H. Skjervold. The municipal flag has the same design as the coat of arms.

Churches
The Church of Norway had four parishes within the municipality of Orkdal. It is part of the Orkdal prosti (deanery) in the Diocese of Nidaros.

Government
While it existed, this municipality was responsible for primary education (through 10th grade), outpatient health services, senior citizen services, unemployment and other social services, zoning, economic development, and municipal roads. During its existence, this municipality was governed by a municipal council of elected representatives, which in turn elected a mayor. The municipality fell under the Trøndelag District Court and the Frostating Court of Appeal.

Municipal council
The municipal council of Orkdal is made up of 35 representatives that are elected to four-year terms. The party breakdown of the final municipal council was as follows:

Mayors
The mayors of Orkdal:

1837–1842: Johan Fredrik Roshauw
1842–1843: Niels Finckenhagen
1844–1847: Johan Fredrik Roshauw
1848–1851: Andreas Lee Bull
1852–1855: Christen Anderssen Rømme
1856–1863: Andreas Lee Bull
1864–1865: H.P. Dahl
1866–1869: Christen Anderssen Rømme
1870–1889: Johan Richter (H)
1890–1895: Lars Garberg (V)
1896–1898: Ole Kvam (V)
1899–1901: Lars Garberg (V)
1902–1916: John Iversen Wolden (V)
1917–1919: Ole T. Hongslo (V)
1920–1937: Ingebrigt I. Ustad (V)
1938–1940: Erik Leland (V)
1941-1941: Sigurd Garberg (V)
1941–1944: Johannes Svendsen (NS)
1944–1945: Asbjørn Hofstad (LL)
1945-1945: Erik Leland (V)
1946–1947: Sigurd Garberg (V)
1948–1951: Nils Jerpstad (Bp)
1952–1959: Olav Ansnes (V)
1960–1962: Nils Jerpstad (Sp)
1963-1963: Sverre Solligård (Ap)
1964–1968: Kolbjørn Larsen (Ap)
1968–1975: Ingrid Sandvik (Ap)
1976–1979: Rasmus Skålholt (Ap)
1979–1983: Kåre Gjønnes (KrF)
1984–1987: Rudolf Larsen (Ap)
1987-1987: Jorunn Wormdahl Asbøll (Ap)
1988–1989: Elling Kvernmo (Sp)
1990–1991: Harald Bugge (H)
1992–1995: Elling Kvernmo (Sp)
1995–1999: Arne Grønset (V)
1999–2015: Gunnar Lysholm (LL)
2015–2019: Oddbjørn Bang (Sp)

Geography

A large part of the population was concentrated in the Orkanger/Fannrem area, which is situated at the head of the Orkdalsfjord, a branch of the large Trondheimsfjord. The Orkla River, one of the better salmon rivers in Norway, meets the sea at Orkanger.

The lakes Hostovatnet, Gangåsvatnet, Våvatnet and Svorksjøen were located around the municipality.

The municipalities of Agdenes, Snillfjord and Hemne were located to the northwest, Rindal and Meldal to the south, and Melhus and Skaun to the east, and Trondheim and Indre Fosen were to the northeast across the Trondheimsfjord.

Notable people
 Johan Bojer, author
 Nils Arne Eggen, the former coach of Rosenborg BK
 Roar Ljøkelsøy, ski jumper
 Gunnhild Sundli, singer of the Norwegian folk music band Gåte
 Sveinung Sundli, fiddle and keyboard player of Gåte

International relations

Twin towns – Sister cities
Orkdal is twinned with:
 Mostar, Bosnia and Herzegovina

See also
List of former municipalities of Norway

References

External links

Municipal fact sheet from Statistics Norway 

 
Orkland
Former municipalities of Norway
1838 establishments in Norway
2020 disestablishments in Norway
Populated places disestablished in 2020